Caythorpe is a hamlet and civil parish in Nottinghamshire, England. According to the 2001 census, it had a population of 259, increasing to 271 at the time of the 2011 Census.

The hamlet has a water mill dated 1749. A windmill stood in a field called Fairholme, later Woolf's Farm. This may be the mill referred to in an advertisement in the Nottingham Review of 1851: "Excellent Windmill containing two pair French Stones, dressing machine etc., cottage, stable, outbuildings, 7 to 8 acres land in occupation of Mr. Arnold." This mill is reputed to have been sold and transferred to Epperstone. A windmill site is shown on the First Series Ordnance Survey map.

References

External links

Newark and Sherwood
Hamlets in Nottinghamshire